Newmarket—Aurora is a federal electoral district in Ontario, Canada, that has been represented in the House of Commons of Canada since 2004.

The district contains the towns of Newmarket, Aurora, and a very small portion of East Gwillimbury.

The riding was created for the 2004 election by merging 50% of the riding of York North with 24% of the riding of Vaughan—King—Aurora.

According to the 2006 census, 121,924 people are represented in the House of Commons in this riding.

The major industry in the riding is manufacturing, and auto parts maker Magna International is the largest manufacturer. According to the 2006 census, the average family income is $118,060 which is higher than the national average. Unemployment in the riding is lower than the national average at 3.6%. Retail trade and the service sector are also important to the economy.

Boundaries
The riding consists of that part of the Regional Municipality of York comprising the town of Newmarket, the part of the town of Aurora north of Wellington street, and the part of the town of East Gwillimbury south of Green Lane and west of Highway 404.

Demographics
According to the Canada 2011 Census; 2013 representation

Ethnic groups: 78.8% White, 4.4% Chinese, 3.5% South Asian, 2.7% Southeast Asian, 2.6% Black, 1.5% Filipino, 1.3% West Asian, 1.2% Latin American 
Languages: 77.2% English, 3.3% Chinese, 1.9% Italian, 1.7% French, 1.7% Russian, 1.4% Spanish, 1.1% Persian
Religions: 66.2% Christian (29.9% Catholic, 8.4% United Church, 7.7% Anglican, 3.5% Christian Orthodox, 2.7% Presbyterian, 1.7% Pentecostal, 1.6% Baptist, 10.7% Other), 2.6% Buddhist, 2.5% Muslim, 1.4% Hindu, 1.2% Jewish, 25.6% No religion 
Median income (2010): $36,416 
Average income (2010): $48,162

Riding associations

Riding associations are the local branches of the national political parties:

Members of Parliament

This riding has elected the following Members of Parliament:

Election results

See also
 List of Canadian federal electoral districts
 Past Canadian electoral districts

References

Riding history from the Library of Parliament
 2011 results from Elections Canada
 Campaign expense data from Elections Canada

Notes

Aurora, Ontario
Newmarket, Ontario
Ontario federal electoral districts